Northwood is a suburb on the Lower North Shore of Sydney, in the state of New South Wales, Australia 8 kilometres north-west of the Sydney central business district, in the local government area of the Municipality of Lane Cove. Northwood is on the northern side of the Lane Cove River between Woodford Bay and Gore Creek.

History
Northwood is named after Northwood House, designed by Edmund Blacket (1817–1883) and built by Mrs Jane Davy in 1878. The name was chosen because it is descriptive of its location, a woodland area in the north. Mrs Davy also built a ferry at her own expense, so that her family could travel to the city by ferry. For the early history of Northwood see John and Pam Ball, Exploring the early history of Northwood, Riverview, 2016.

Heritage listings 
Northwood has a number of heritage-listed sites, including:
 1 Private Road: Northwood House

Transport
The nearest railway station is St Leonards and buses run frequently through the area. Northwood ferry wharf provides access to the Captain Cook Cruises Lane Cove River ferry service, which is popular for workers who commute to the CBD by ferry to Circular Quay.

Population

Demographics
In the 2016 Australian Bureau of Statistics Census of Population and Housing, the population of Northwood stood at 982 people, 49.2% females and 50.8% males, with a median age of 45 years. 31.3% of the population was born overseas with England (5.5%), Malaysia (2.1%) and New Zealand (1.5%) the most common. The five strongest religious affiliations in the area were in descending order: Catholic (29.5%), no religion (28.2%), Anglican (19.4%), and Uniting Church (3.4%).

Northwood's population is typically wealthy, with a median weekly household income of 4,152, compared with A$1,438 in Australia. The most common types of occupation for employed persons were Professionals (48.6%), Managers (17.4%), and Clerical and Administrative Workers (12.1%). 91.0% of the suburbs occupied private dwellings were family households, and 9.0% were single (lone) person households.

Notable residents
Northwood was the home of landscape artist Lloyd Rees for many years before his death in 1988. Many of his later paintings are of the area.

Northwood was also home to portrait artist William Edwin Pidgeon, aka Bill Pidgeon and WEP, (1909 – 1981) who was an Australian painter. He won the Archibald Prize three times, 1958, 1961 and 1968.

References

"The Gardener's Gamble" by Helen Laidlaw

Suburbs of Sydney
Lane Cove Council